Ignacio Miguel González-Llubera (1893–1962) was a Spanish literary scholar, specialising in Judaeo-Spanish literature. Born in Barcelona, he was educated at the Colegio del Sagrado Corazón, the University of Barcelona (for his undergraduate degree) and the University of Madrid (for his doctorate in Semitic studies). He then studied in Madrid, Paris, London and Cambridge before he was appointed the first lecturer in Spanish at Queen's University Belfast in 1920. He was appointed its first Professor of Spanish in 1926, a chair he held until he retired in 1960.

References 

1893 births
1962 deaths
Hispanists
Spanish literature
Judaeo-Spanish languages
University of Barcelona alumni
Complutense University of Madrid alumni
Academics of Queen's University Belfast